Miroslav Minchev (born 17 January 1989) is a Bulgarian male track cyclist, representing Bulgaria at international competitions. He competed at the 2016 UEC European Track Championships in the team sprint event and the 1km time trial event.

References

1989 births
Living people
Bulgarian male cyclists
Bulgarian track cyclists
Place of birth missing (living people)